Frances Lima is a British actress known for her brief role as Georgina Lee in ITV soap opera Emmerdale. She also been a guest on The Bill for 3 episodes.

Filmography
 The Imitators (1996)
 The Theory of Flight (1998)
 Metrosexuality (1999)
 The Bill (2000–2005)
 Rocket Man (2005)
 EastEnders (2012)

External links
 

Living people
Year of birth missing (living people)
British television actresses
Place of birth missing (living people)